Motasingha trimaculata, the three spot skipper, is a butterfly of the family Hesperiidae. It is found in Australia.

The wingspan is about 35 mm.

The larvae feed on Lepidosperma angustatum, Lepidosperma carphoides, Lepidosperma concavum, Lepidosperma viscidum and Phlebocarya ciliata.

Subspecies
Motasingha trimaculata trimaculata (Victoria and South Australia)
Motasingha trimaculata dea (New South Wales)
Motasingha trimaculata dilata (New South Wales)
Motasingha trimaculata occidentalis (Western Australia)

External links
 Australian Caterpillars

Trapezitinae
Butterflies described in 1882
Butterflies of Australia